In enzymology, a N-carbamoylputrescine amidase is an enzyme that catalyzes the chemical reaction

N-carbamoylputrescine + H2O  putrescine + CO2 + NH3

Thus, the two substrates of this enzyme are N-carbamoylputrescine and H2O, whereas its 3 products are putrescine, CO2, and NH3.

This enzyme belongs to the family of hydrolases, those acting on carbon-nitrogen bonds other than peptide bonds, specifically in linear amides.  The systematic name of this enzyme class is N-carbamoylputrescine amidohydrolase. Other names in common use include carbamoylputrescine hydrolase, and NCP.  This enzyme participates in urea cycle and metabolism of amino groups.

References

 

EC 3.5.1
Enzymes of unknown structure